An equestrian statue of José de San Martín by Louis-Joseph Daumas is installed in Manhattan's Central Park, in the U.S. state of New York. The sculpture was cast  and dedicated on May 25, 1951.

References

External links

 

1950s establishments in New York (state)
1950s sculptures
Cultural depictions of José de San Martín
Equestrian statues in New York City
Monuments and memorials in Manhattan
Outdoor sculptures in Manhattan
Sculptures of men in New York City